Richard Alan North FRS  (born 1944) is a British biomedical scientist, and Professor Emeritus at the University of Manchester.  North grew up in Halifax, West Yorkshire and attended Heath Grammar School, before studying at University of Aberdeen.  He graduated in medicine (MB ChB) and in physiology (BSc).  He took a PhD in the group of Hans Walter Kosterlitz, and worked in Aberdeen hospitals as house office and registrar.

Biomedical research 
North's research has been at the interface of physiology, pharmacology and neuroscience.  As a PhD student, he discovered the two main classes of neuron in the enteric nervous system and described new type of slow synaptic connection. As a professor at Loyola University Stritch School of Medicine (1975–1981), the Massachusetts Institute of Technology(1981–1986), and the Vollum Institute, Oregon Heath Sciences University (1987–1993), he showed that opiates, as well as several other amine and peptide neurotransmitters, inhibit the activity of neurons by opening potassium-selective ion channels in the cell membrane. This required the development of a method to record electrical activity from single neurons maintained alive in thin brain slices.  With John Adelman, he cloned calcium- and voltage-gated potassium channels from the brain.  At the Glaxo Institute for Molecular Biology (later Geneva Biomedical Research Institute, 1993–1998) he led the group that isolated complementary DNAs for the family of P2X receptors: these are membrane proteins and ion channels through which extracellular adenosine 5'-triphosphate (ATP) exerts many of its actions.

North was Professor of Molecular Physiology at the University of Sheffield (1998–2004).

Academic leadership 

From 2004 to 2011, he was Vice-President of the University of Manchester, serving both as Dean of its Faculty of Life Sciences (2004–2008) and Dean of its Faculty of Medical and Human Sciences (2006–2011), as well as being the inaugural Director of the Manchester Academic Health Sciences Centre.  He served on the UK Medical Research Council (2001 to 2006), and was a member of the International Advisory Board of the Korea Research Council for Fundamental Science and Technology(2009–2011).

Mountaineering 
Alan North is also a mountaineer, and has climbed extensively throughout Scotland and the Alps.  He has made several first ascents or new routes on peaks of Upernivik Island, Greenland, and other mountains in the Hindu Kush of Afghanistan, and Peak Lenin in the Soviet Pamirs.  He is a long-standing member of the Scottish Mountaineering Club.

Honours and awards 

 Fellow, Winston Churchill Memorial Trust, 1968
 Fellowship, Medical Research Council, 1971
 MERIT Award, National Institute of Drug Abuse, 1987
 Fellow, Royal Society of London, 1995
 Honorary DSc, University of Aberdeen, 1998
 Fellow, Royal College of Physicians, 2000
 President, The Physiological Society, 2002–2005
 Editor-in-Chief, British Journal of Pharmacology, 2000–2003
 Member, Academia Europaea, 2004
 Fellow, Academy of Medical Science, 2004
 Honorary Fellow, British Pharmacological Society, 2012
 Honorary Member, The Physiological Society, 2013

References 

1944 births
Living people
Alumni of the University of Aberdeen
British neuroscientists
Fellows of the Royal Society
Presidents of The Physiological Society